Replication factor C subunit 3 is a protein that in humans is encoded by the RFC3 gene.

Function 

The elongation of primed DNA templates by DNA polymerase delta and DNA polymerase epsilon requires the accessory proteins proliferating cell nuclear antigen (PCNA) and replication factor C (RFC). RFC, also named activator 1, is a protein complex consisting of five distinct subunits of 140, 40, 38, 37, and 36 kDa. This gene encodes the 38 kDa subunit. This subunit is essential for the interaction between the 140 kDa subunit and the core complex that consists of the 36, 37, and 40 kDa subunits. Alternatively spliced transcript variants encoding distinct isoforms have been described.

Interactions 

RFC3 has been shown to interact with:
 BRD4, 
 CHTF18, 
 PCNA, 
 RFC1,  and
 RFC4.

References

Further reading